The Fortaleza de Santo António da Ponta da Mina or Forte de Ponta da Mina is a ruined fort located east of the island capital Santo António in the island of Príncipe in São Tomé and Príncipe. It is located at the headland Ponta da Mina. The fortress consisted of two parts: the Bateria Real and the Bateria do Príncipe.

The fort was built in 1695. In 1706, the city of Santo António was invaded by the French during the Spanish War of Succession, destroying the town and its fortress. It was repaired several times, and was finally abandoned in the early 20th century.

See also
Portuguese Empire
List of buildings and structures in São Tomé and Príncipe

References

Further reading
Matos, Raimundo José da Cunha. Corografia Histórica das Ilhas de S. Tomé, Príncipe, Ano Bom e Fernando Pó (4a. ed.). São Tomé: Imprensa Nacional, 1916.
Melo, José Brandão Pereira de. A Fortaleza de Santo António da Ponta da Mina. Lisboa: Agência-Geral do Ultramar 1969. (Coleção Figuras e Feitos de Além-Mar, no. 5) 87p.

Príncipe
Buildings and structures in São Tomé and Príncipe
Buildings and structures completed in 1695
1695 establishments in the Portuguese Empire
Portuguese colonial architecture in São Tomé and Príncipe